"Centipede" is the debut single by American singer Rebbie Jackson, and the title track from her debut album Centipede.

Background
The song was written and produced by Jackson's younger brother Michael Jackson. He, and The Weather Girls, also sang backing vocals on the song. The 12" single includes an extended mix and an instrumental version. On the back of the single, Michael Jackson dedicated the song "to my mannequin friends".

The song was later re-released on The Rebbie Jackson Collection and the original 12" version was included on her 1998 comeback album Yours Faithfully.

Release and reception
Released in the late summer of 1984, the single climbed high on the Billboard R&B charts, peaking at number 4 there and at number 24 in the main Billboard Hot 100 chart.  It was Jackson's highest charting single to date and her only single to enter the Hot 100, although she had several more hits on the R&B chart throughout the decade. The single was Gold-certified by the RIAA, selling 500,000 copies in the USA.

Charts

Certifications

Personnel
Lead vocals: Rebbie Jackson
Background vocals: Michael Jackson, The Weather Girls (Izora Rhodes, Martha Wash)
Arranger: Michael Jackson
John Barnes: Synthesizers and Drum Programming
David Williams: Guitar
Jerry Hey: Flugelhorn

Samples
"Centipede" was sampled in Brand Nubian's song "Let's Dance", found on their 1998 album Foundation.

References

Rebbie Jackson songs
1984 debut singles
Songs written by Michael Jackson
Song recordings produced by Michael Jackson
1984 songs
Columbia Records singles